Stavares "Steve" Andropoulos and Elizabeth "Betsy" Stewart Andropoulos are fictional characters and a super couple from the American soap opera "As The World Turns" which aired for almost 54 years before being canceled due to low ratings. Steve was portrayed by actor Frank Runyeon and Betsy was portrayed by both actress Meg Ryan and actress Lindsay Frost. The fictional couple wed on May 30, 1984; The episode attracted 20 million viewers making it the second highest-rated hour in American soap opera history.

Storyline
Steve fell in love with Betsy in 1982. The feeling was mutual and Betsy offered to give him her trust fund money so he could start his own business. Though touched by the gesture, Steve refused her offer. Despite everyone's efforts to keep the news a secret, Steve's brother, Nick, found out that the pair was dating and suspecting that Steve was only after Betsy's trust fund. Nick went after Steve with Betsy in attendance. Though a panicked Betsy promised to stop seeing him, Nick found them picnicking together and violently confronted Steve. In the course of the argument, Nick had a massive heart attack. In agony, Nick muttered that he wished he'd killed Steve.  After extracting a promise from Betsy never to see Steve again, Nick died.

Betsy vowed to stay away from Steve and entered into a hasty marriage with Craig Montgomery after he saved her from an explosion. Betsy married Craig in 1983. By the time Craig and Betsy were pronounced husband and wife, Steve was standing outside the church in the rain, severely heartbroken. Betsy's marriage was strained however due to Craig's jealousy and an unhappy Betsy left him to go to Spain. 

Upon returning to Oakdale, Betsy was ready to leave Craig, but lost her nerve when he planned a romantic evening for her. Torn between her love for Steve and her commitment to Craig, Betsy made love to Craig. When Betsy later became pregnant, she was convinced the child was Craig's and decided to commit herself to her marriage. Although Betsy reluctantly chose to remain with Craig, Steve could not accept the idea that she didn't love him anymore. And Craig went to great lengths to rub in the fact that Steve and Diana McColl seemed to be an item now.   

Soon after, Steve was wanted by the police for the theft of Whit McColl's gold coins. Later, Betsy, who had been out shopping, got into her car and found a wounded Steve in the back seat. Despite knowing that he was wanted by the police, she took him to the boathouse and tended to his wounds. Betsy enlisted Steve's friend, Tucker Foster, to help them find out who framed Steve. She thought it was Whit, but Tucker was sure it was Craig. Then Betsy's grandfather, David, caught Betsy sneaking into the supply room at Memorial Hospital to get medicine for Steve. She begged her grandfather to come and examine him. David discovered that Steve was suffering from blood poisoning and gangrene and would die unless he got treatment. With Betsy's help, David operated on Steve right there in the boathouse.

Meanwhile, one of Whit's rare coins had been bought by Bobbi Maxwell and her boyfriend, Lonnie. They traced Tucker from the pawnshop and called him for a meeting. Betsy and Steve joined the "coin hunt" and arrived for the meeting to try to buy back the coin. Actually, Craig was relieved, because now he could spend more time with Diana. But when Betsy told Craig she was going to call her broker and sell some stocks to get money for the cruise, Craig panicked. He had made some bad investments and had lost all her money in the stock market. The Montgomeries were broke, only Betsy didn't know it yet. In the process of attempting to help Steve, Betsy found that she was still in love with him and decided to leave her husband. 

Upon returning from a romantic evening with Steve at the boathouse, Betsy went into labor. It was a breech birth, and Steve had to get her to the hospital quickly. Diana discovered him there and tried to get him to leave, but Steve couldn't tear himself away from Betsy, who gave birth to a healthy daughter. In remembrance of her father Dan, she named the child Danielle. Craig told his wife how much he loved her, and now that they had a child, he hoped things would be all right between them. Although Betsy told Craig it was over, things changed when he was fired from his job. Later, Betsy was so moved when she heard Craig talking to his sleeping daughter about his losses, and weakly told Steve she couldn't leave Craig right now. When Steve exploded, Betsy stormed out, saying that they were through.

On Kim's advice, a sad Betsy wrote a note to Steve telling him how much she loved him. However, unbeknownst to her, Craig found the note, tore it up and forged a new one saying Betsy loved Craig and regretted having to betray him. The next morning, when Betsy came to see Steve, Diana answered the door wearing only Steve's shirt. Devastated, Betsy decided she couldn't stay with Craig, so she moved in with Kim. The next morning when Betsy arrived to get the rest of her things, Craig picked a fight with her and seemed to fall down the stairs. Craig then cried "paralysis," getting Betsy to move back in with him. A major storm ushered in the New Year. After it had passed, Betsy's boathouse was on shaky ground. 

She surprised Craig by telling him she planned to build a home for abandoned children on the lot and call it the Refuge. Steve's construction company put in a bid. Diana heard about Steve's plans, got hold of the other bids, and changed them, making Steve's the lowest. Steve and Tucker's company got the job. When Betsy couldn't go through with a romantic evening, Craig left in disgust. Upset that Steve was hindering her marriage, Betsy tried to destroy everything that reminded her of him. She found the book of Greek poetry Steve had given her when they first met and decided to give it back to him. When Betsy arrived at Steve's apartment, she tried to say she was through with him, but the chemistry between them was too strong, and they fell into a passionate embrace. Betsy and Steve agreed not to make love until after she had left Craig. After Craig accused her of having an affair with Steve, Betsy told Craig their marriage was over. Then she went upstairs to pack and discovered that Danielle was gone. Craig said he couldn't let Betsy take her away, so he hid her. Craig threatened to leave town with Danielle if Betsy called the police, and if she went to Steve, she'd never see her daughter again. Luckily, Craig's mother, Lyla, traced Danielle to the home of Mrs. Hoffman, a maid whom Betsy had fired previously, and Danielle was returned to her mother. At the same time, Diana McColl informed Steve that she knew Craig was faking his paralysis. Steve found Betsy at Kim's, and when she told him she'd left Craig for good, they had a joyful reunion.

One day while driving, Betsy was in a terrible accident in Vermont. When she woke up, she needed plastic surgery because of the burns on her face and she had no memory of who she was. Alone and vulnerable, Betsy found herself becoming close to her doctor and agreed to marry him. After a while, though she started getting flashbacks of Oakdale and had to go there. While in Oakdale, Craig recognised Betsy and he reunited her with her family. At the same time, Steve had been arrested for the murder of Whit McColl. However, the McColl housekeeper Dorothy Connors confessed to the crime on the witness stand. 

Their life continued to be difficult though. Though Betsy loved Steve, they found themselves arguing more and more about money. Steve wanted the best for Betsy and spent lavishly but refused to tell Betsy where the money was coming from. Money pressures mounted when administration assistant Iva Snyder had an accident and Steve was unable to pay her medical bills.  Soon they found themselves in debt, and Steve had to declare bankruptcy.  Lucinda Walsh ended up buying Steve's construction company. He almost slept with Betsy's younger sister, Emily. Ashamed, Steve left Betsy to start over in Greece. Betsy went to visit him but was heartbroken to learn that Steve was arrested and sentenced a life sentence in a Greek jail for trafficking drugs and with much sorrow, she divorced him in the winter of 1987.

 After a failed attempt at romance with Josh Snyder, Betsy decided to get away from Oakdale and in 1988, she and Dani moved to Wisconsin to live near her uncle Ronnie Talbot. She did live briefly with Seth Snyder.

Characters 

 Elizebeth ''Betsy'' Stewart- She's a character in the soap opera As the world turns. She is in love with Steve Andropoulos, but she was tied to Craig Montgomery in a hasty marriage. She had promised Steve's brother, Nick, that she won't marry Steve. After finding out about Craig's misdeeds, she divorced him and married Steve, then went to Greece for their honeymoon.
 Steve Andropoulos- He is in love with Betsy. He was framed for stealing Whit McColl's gold coins and almost arrested for the murder of him but pardoned as Dorothy Connors pleaded guilty. Afterward, he was arrested and given a life sentence in a Greek jail for drug trafficking, and Betsy hesitantly divorced him.
 Craig Montgomery- Craig married Betsy after he saved her from an explosion. He made love with her, which resulted in Betsy getting pregnant. They had the child and named her Danielle. However, the baby was really Steve's. 
 Diana McColl- The spoilt daughter of Whit McColl. Was pregnant with Steve's baby but had a miscarriage. Went into the Witness Protection Program when her restaurant was involved in illegal activities. 
 Daniel Stewart- Betsy's father, died in 1979.
 David and Ellen Hughes-Betsy's paternal grandparents. Very close to Betsy and Dani.
 Kim Hughes-Betsy's stepmother. The two have a very close relationship. Betsy was Kim's bridesmaid when Kim married Dr. Bob Hughes.
 Danielle- Betsy and Steve's daughter. Nickname Dani.
 Dorothy Connors- The McColls' housekeeper.Mother to Jay Connors.

Cast 

 Meg Ryan, Lindsay Frost- Betsy Stewart
 Frank Runyeon- Steve Andropoulos
 Scott Bryce- Craig Montgomery
 Kim Johnston Ulrich- Diana McColl
 Kathryn Hays-Kim Hughes
 Henderson Forsythe and Patricia Bruder- David and Ellen Stewart
 John Colenback- Dan Stewart
 Kristanna Loken- Danielle (Colleen Broomhall played Danielle as a toddler)
 Nancy Pinkerton- Dorothy Connors

See also
List of supercouples

Further reading
 To Be Continued... Soap Operas Around the World, Robert C. Allen, Taylor & Francis (2002)
 Soap Opera Super Couples: The Great Romances of Daytime Drama, Henrietta Roos, McFarland (2016)
 Television: Critical Methods and Applications, Jeremy G. Butler, Taylor & Francis (2016)
 Politics in Familiar Contexts: Projecting Politics Through Popular Media, Robert L. Savage and Dan D. Nimmo, Ablex Publishing (1990)
 Writing for the Soaps, Jean Rouverol, Writer's Digest Books (1984)
 Worlds Without End: The Art and History of the Soap Opera, Robert Morton, The University of Michigan (1997)

References

Television articles that need to differentiate between fact and fiction
As the World Turns characters
Soap opera supercouples